The 2021 European Weightlifting Championships took place in Moscow, Russia, from 3 to 11 April 2021.

Medal overview

Men

Women

Medal table
Note: Daniyar İsmayilov, who originally won the gold medal in the men's 73kg event, was disqualified after he tested positive for a banned substance; his medals have not yet been reallocated.

Ranking by Big (Total result) medals

Ranking by all medals: Big (Total result) and Small (Snatch and Clean & Jerk)

Team ranking

Men

Women

Men's results

Men's 55 kg

Men's 61 kg

Men's 67 kg

Men's 73 kg

Men's 81 kg

Men's 89 kg

Men's 96 kg

Men's 102 kg

Men's 109 kg

Men's +109 kg

Women's results

Women's 45 kg

Women's 49 kg

Women's 55 kg

Women's 59 kg

Women's 64 kg

Women's 71 kg

Women's 76 kg

Women's 81 kg

Women's 87 kg

Women's +87 kg

Participating countries
A total of 315 competitors from 38 nations participated.

References

External links
European Weightlifting Federation 
Results book 

European Weightlifting Championships
European Championships
European Weightlifting Championships
International weightlifting competitions hosted by Russia
Sports competitions in Moscow
European Weightlifting Championships
2021 in Moscow